"Sea Legs" is a song by American indie rock band The Shins, and is the fifth track on their third album Wincing the Night Away. The song was also released as the fourth single from that album in the United Kingdom on December 2, 2007 as a digital download. The 7" was limited to only 500 copies and came signed by the band. "Strange Powers" is a Magnetic Fields cover.

Track listings
"Sea Legs" 7":
"Sea Legs (radio edit)" - 4:25
"Strange Powers (The Magnetic Fields cover)"

"Sea Legs" download:
"Sea Legs (radio edit)" - 4:25

Personnel
 James Mercer – vocals, guitar, bass, synthesizers, electric piano, beat and MIDI programming
 Martin Crandall – synthesizers, bass
 Dave Hernandez – lead guitar
 Jesse Sandoval – drums

Songs about oceans and seas
The Shins songs
2007 singles
Songs written by James Mercer (musician)
2007 songs
Sub Pop singles